|}

The Queen Mother Champion Chase is a Grade 1 National Hunt steeplechase in Great Britain which is open to horses aged five years or older. As part of a sponsorship agreement with the online betting company Betway, the race is now known as the Betway Queen Mother Champion Chase. It is run on the Old Course at Cheltenham over a distance of about 2 miles (1 mile 7 furlongs and 199 yards, or 3,199 metres), and during its running there are thirteen fences to be jumped. The race is scheduled to take place each year during the Cheltenham Festival in March.

It is the leading minimum-distance chase in the National Hunt calendar, and it is the feature race on the second day of the Festival.

History
The event was established in 1959, and it was originally called the National Hunt Two-Mile Champion Chase. It was given its present title in 1980 – the year of the Queen Mother's 80th birthday – in recognition of her support to jump racing. The Queen Mother was a successful owner of National Hunt horses, particularly chasers, and among these was Game Spirit – the runner-up in this race in 1976.

The Queen Mother Champion Chase was not sponsored before 2007, and between 2008 and 2010 it was backed by Seasons Holidays.
The sponsor from 2011 until 2013 was online gambling firm Sportingbet. BetVictor held naming rights for the 2014 season before the current sponsor, sports betting company Betway, took over.

Records
Most successful horse (3 wins):
 Badsworth Boy – 1983, 1984, 1985

Leading jockey (5 wins):
 Pat Taaffe – Fortria (1960, 1961), Ben Stack (1964), Flyingbolt (1966), Straight Fort (1970)
 Barry Geraghty – Moscow Flyer (2003, 2005), Big Zeb (2010), Finian's Rainbow (2012), Sprinter Sacre (2013)

Leading trainer (6 wins):
 Tom Dreaper – Fortria (1960, 1961), Ben Stack (1964), Flyingbolt (1966), Muir (1969), Straight Fort (1970)
 Nicky Henderson - Remittance Man (1992), Finian's Rainbow (2012), Sprinter Sacre (2013, 2016), Altior (2018, 2019)
 Paul Nicholls - Call Equiname (1999), Azertyuiop (2004), Master Minded (2008, 2009), Dodging Bullets (2015), Politologue (2020)

Leading owner (3 wins):
 George Ansley – Fortria (1960, 1961), Straight Fort (1970)
 Doug Armitage – Badsworth Boy (1983, 1984, 1985)
 John Hales - One Man (1998), Azertyuiop (2004), Politologue (2020)

Winners

See also
 Horse racing in Great Britain
 List of British National Hunt races
 Recurring sporting events established in 1959  – this race is included under its original title, National Hunt Two-Mile Champion Chase.

References

 Racing Post:

 bbc.co.uk – "Royalty absent and present" (2003).
 cheltenham.co.uk – Media information pack (2010).
 pedigreequery.com – Queen Mother Champion Chase – Cheltenham.
 sportingchronicle.com – Queen Mother Champion Two Mile Steeple Chase Past Winners.

External links
 Race Recordings 

National Hunt races in Great Britain
Cheltenham Racecourse
National Hunt chases
Recurring sporting events established in 1959
1959 establishments in England